Asya Bussie (born April 16, 1991) is an American professional basketball player.  Born in Baltimore, Maryland, she was drafted in 2014 by the Minnesota Lynx of the WNBA.

West Virginia  statistics

Source

References

External links
WNBA Rookie Profile

1991 births
Living people
American women's basketball players
Basketball players from Baltimore
Centers (basketball)
Minnesota Lynx draft picks
Seton Keough High School alumni
West Virginia Mountaineers women's basketball players